Arunthathiyar is a scheduled caste community mostly found in the Indian state of Tamil Nadu. The term has two distinct usages: for the purposes of the state government's positive discrimination program, in 2009 it was designated an umbrella term for the Arunthatiyar, Chakkiliyar (Sakkiliyar), Madari, Madiga, Pagadai, Semman, Thoti and Adi Dravida communities; while the Office of the Registrar-General, which administrates the census of India, does not recognise all of those communities as one.

The 2001 Census of India reported that there were 771,659 Arunthathiyar in Tamil Nadu, being 6.5 per cent of the Scheduled Caste population of the state.

Origin 
Due to their speaking Telugu and lack of mention in early Tamil texts, most scholarly authorities believe the community originated in Andhra Pradesh and migrated to Tamil Nadu in the 17th century. However, the community's own history is that they are originally Tamil kings who ruled the area around Tagadur (Dharmapuri), who were taken as captives in war to Andhra and Karnataka in ancient days and only returned in the 16th century as the Kannada-speaking Madiyars and Tamil-speaking Chakkiliyars. Therefore, they called themselves Adi Tamizhar.

Occupation 
The Arunthathiyars, although they never touched dead cattle, still worked with leather and leatherworkers and cobblers, and were thus given a low social status in Hinduism Caste system. Many are also landless agricultural labourers and are engaged in bonded labour.

Current status 
The vast majority of the community, almost 18.27 lakhs, live in Tamil Nadu, with small minorities in neighbouring states. Small populations live in the Palakkad district of Kerala (40,507), and southern parts of Andhra Pradesh (30,190) and Karnataka (2,959). 62% of the community lived in rural areas, and the literacy rate is 60%.

Many Arunthathiyars in northern Tamil Nadu work as landless agricultural labourers for Naidu landlords, and their women work as domestic help in their houses. Some girls from the community are dedicated to the Mathamma cult, a local village deity tradition.

Notable people 
 Madurai Veeran - King and commander-in-chief (Thirumalai Nayakkar Period)
 Ondiveeran - King and commander of an army who fought against the British East India Company in Tamil Nadu
 Rao Sahib L.C. Gurusamy - Member of the round table conference team led by B. R. Ambedkar; founder of Arunthathiyar Mahajana Saba. Member of the Justice Party, social activist and politician
 H. M. Jagannathan - Member of the Justice Party, social activist and politician, graduated in law.
 V. P. Duraisamy - Politician and former DMK general secretary, current vice president of Tamil Nadu BJP
 P. Dhanapal - Former speaker of the Tamil Nadu Legislative Assembly (2016-2021)
 L. Murugan - Current union minister of state of ministries of animal husbandry

References

Dalit communities
Scheduled Castes of Tamil Nadu